Asadabad-e Pain (also Romanized as Asadābād-e Pā’īn; also known as Asadābād-e Soflá, Asadābād-e Soflā, and Asadābād-i-Khān) is a village in Mehrabad Rural District, Bahman District, Abarkuh County, Yazd Province, Iran. At the 2006 census, its population was 218, in 71 families.

References 

Populated places in Abarkuh County